Hutchens may refer to:

Surname

Cyril Hutchens, Australian politician
Frank Hutchens (1892–1965), pianist and composer from New Zealand
Giles Hutchens (before 1556-1624), English politician
Harry Hutchens (1858–1939), American sprint runner
Paul Hutchens (1902–1977), American author
Sandra Hutchens, Sheriff-Coroner of Orange County, California, United States
W. T. Hutchens (1859–1940), American politician; former mayor of Huntsville, Alabama

Others
Hutchens device, a device for protecting race car drivers in the event of an accident
Hutchens v. Stout, a case before the North Carolina Court of Appeals in 1986
The Hutchens, American country music trio

See also
Hutchins (disambiguation)